The Center for Progressive Leadership (CPL) was an American 501(c)(3) non-profit organization providing leadership training for advancing progressive political and policy change.

Training
The organization offered 9-month part-time leadership development trainings for a select group of organizational leaders, future candidates, community organizers, and progressive activists in Arizona, Colorado, Michigan, Ohio, Pennsylvania and Wisconsin. 

In 2012, CPL merged with Social Justice Leadership (SJL).

References

External links
Guide To Servant Leadership
Leadership & Management Training

Leadership training
Organizations established in 2003
Charities based in Washington, D.C.
Organizations disestablished in 2012
2003 establishments in Washington, D.C.
2012 disestablishments in Washington, D.C.
Defunct progressive organizations in the United States